Novotel Citygate Hong Kong is a 4-star hotel in Hong Kong. It opened in April 2006, and is managed by AccorHotels. Novotel Citygate has 440 rooms including 14 suites from 26 to 45 square metres, 3 restaurants and a bar, a gym, an outdoor swimming pool and meeting facilities.

The hotel is located near various attractions on Lantau Island, including the Citygate Outlets shopping centre, the AsiaWorld–Expo exhibition centre, the Ngong Ping Cable Car, Hong Kong Disneyland, SkyPlaza, SkyCity Nine Eagles Golf Course, and Tai O fishing village.

Design
The original interior design was started by Simon Jackson, who arranged guest rooms in a herringbone design. Later on, Hong Kong architect and designer, Steve Leung completed the task. In addition, the restaurants and bar were designed by interior designer, Yasumichi Morita. The Feng Shui elements located at garden and sun terrace were designed by landscape architect Sandy Duggie.

The number three represents “liveliness” in Feng Shui. The hotel entrance features three geometric beds of bamboo in low ground cover, and a still water pool. 
The revolving door contains 3 leaves and moves in a clockwise direction, which represents good luck in and bad luck out. The revolving door is 4.8m high and is the tallest revolving door in the world and has held the Guinness Record since 2006.

At the poolside garden terrace, there is a white marble sculpture named ‘Trans for Matter’ by Italian sculptor Polo Bourieau. 
Water runs from the sculpture and through a narrow channel across the center of a spacious timber sundeck and down to a large granite waterfall.

Facilities
Novotel Citygate has 440 rooms and suites with airport, sea and mountain views, including 2 rooms that provide access for people with disabilities. Broadband connection is available inside the hotel. Facilities include 3 restaurants and a bar, 7 function rooms, an outdoor swimming pool and 24-hour gymnasium.

Transportation
Mass Transit Railway (MTR)
The hotel is direct access to Tung Chung MTR station via Citygate Outlets, it takes 28 minutes to Central MTR station.
Complimentary Airport Shuttle
Complimentary shuttle service to/from Hong Kong International Airport from 6am – 11:45pm hours at 15-minute intervals. Shuttle bus station located at coach bay 29-30 in Terminal 2. Please approach B16 counter upon arrival at the Arrival Hall.
Hotel Shuttle to AsiaWorld–Expo
Shuttle bus to AsiaWorld–Expo runs on selected trade show periods.
Airport Coach Service to Shenzhen and Guangdong Province 
Coaches are available from the airport to Shenzhen, Guangzhou, Dongguan, Shenzhen Airport, Huizhou, Foshan, Zhongshan.
Coach Service to Shenzhen in Citygate Outlets 
Coaches are available from Citygate Outlets to Huanggang, Shenzhen.

References

External links

Citygate
Hotel buildings completed in 2006
Hotels established in 2006
Hotels in Hong Kong
Tung Chung
New World Development